"Sakura" is the debut single of Japanese trio Ikimono-gakari, released in Japan on March 15, 2006. The single peaked at number 17 on the weekly Oricon chart, charting for 31 weeks. It also reached number 182 on the yearly chart for 2006. "Sakura" was certified platinum by the Recording Industry Association of Japan (digital download single).

The A-side was used in a commercial promoting NTT's Denpo 115 service. Track 3, "Sotsugyō Shashin", was included on the 2009 Yumi Matsutoya tribute album "Shout At Yuming Rocks".

The single was certified gold for physical copies shipped in May 2011, and double platinum for ringtone downloads.

Track listing

References

External links
 

2006 debut singles
Ikimono-gakari songs
Songs about cherry blossom